The Chinese Elm cultivar Ulmus parvifolia 'Emerald Prairie' was raised by Kansas State University and released in 2004.

Description
The tree can reach a height of about 13 m, with a spread slightly less at approximately 12 m. It is distinguished by its superior foliar quality.

Pests and diseases
The species and its cultivars are highly resistant, but not immune, to Dutch elm disease, and unaffected by the Elm Leaf Beetle Xanthogaleruca luteola. 'Emerald Prairie' is also noted for its resistance to black spot.

Cultivation
'Emerald Prairie' has yet to be grown beyond North America.

Accessions
None known.

References

Chinese elm cultivar
Ulmus articles missing images
Ulmus